Singing the Living Tradition is a hymnal published by the Unitarian Universalist Association.

History 
First published in 1993 by the Hymnbook Resources Commission of the UUA, it was meant to be much more inclusive in both gender references, multicultural sources, and a wider number of religious inspirations. According to Jason Shelton,

Singing the Living Tradition was the first standard denominational hymnbook to include songs from Unitarians in Eastern Europe, spirituals from the African American tradition, folk and popular songs, music of major, non-Christian religious traditions, and chants and rounds gathered from the various traditions of the world.

The hymnal succeeded the UUA's first hymnal, Hymns for the Celebration of Life, which had been amended repeatedly in the decades after its initial 1964 publication due to concerns over biased gender language.

List of hymns and tunes
The hymns are split up by subject, such as theme (Commitment/Action, Love and Compassion, Hope, Freedom, Justice, Stewardship of the Earth) time (Morning, Evening, The Seasons, Harvest, Solstice and Equinox), origin (Music of The Cultures of the World, Words from Sacred Traditions, The Jewish Spirit, The Christian Spirit), holiday (Kwanzaa, Pesach / Passover, Hanukkah, Advent, Christmas, Easter), and for specific services or parts of services (Entrance Songs, Chalice Lightings, Weddings, Memorials and Funerals, Recessionals).

Three of the hymns - "Your Mercy, Oh Eternal One", "Now I Recall My Childhood", and "There Are Numerous Strings" - were written by Rabindranath Tagore.

Evensong
Evensong is the name of a programmed series of gatherings undertaken as part of the Unitarian Universalist Association's Adult Religious Education initiative. The goal is to deepen spiritual awareness and commitment while increasing fellowship among members. The format includes hymns and readings from Singing the Living Tradition followed by a discussion on a pertinent spiritual topic. The gathering is closed with another hymn.

External links 

 Singing the Living Tradition

References

Hymnals
Unitarian Universalism
1993 books